Nico Göhler (born 22 May 2003) is a German racing driver who last competed in the 2021 Formula Regional European Championship, driving for KIC Motorsport.

Career

Lower formulae 
Born in Helmstedt, Göhler started his career in 2019 in the Formula 4 UAE Championship for Mücke Motorsport under an Emirati licence alongside Joshua Dürksen. His first podium came in the final race of the first event at the Dubai Autodrome with a third-place finish. He scored two more podiums, both in Dubai, and finished sixth in the standings, four positions behind teammate Dürksen.

Following that the German signed for ADAC Berlin-Brandenburg to drive in the ADAC Formula 4 Championship, reuniting him with Dürksen. Göhler scored nine points throughout the season and came in 18th in the championship. He also raced for Mücke Motorsport in two rounds of the Italian F4 Championship.

In January 2020 Göhler once again competed in the F4 UAE Championship. He won four races, two each at the Dubai Autodrome and the Yas Marina Circuit and finished third in the drivers' standings, behind Lorenzo Fluxá and Champion Francesco Pizzi.

Formula Regional European Championship 
In 2020 Göhler made his debut in the Formula Regional European Championship for KIC Motorsport in Austria. He scored points in the first two races of the weekend, although he was forced to retire from the final race. The German made another appearance at Monza. At the end of the year Göhler had scored twelve points and finished 16th in the championship.

Racing record

Racing career summary 

* Season still in progress.

Complete Formula 4 UAE Championship results 
(key) (Races in bold indicate pole position; races in italics indicate fastest lap)

Complete ADAC Formula 4 Championship results
(key) (Races in bold indicate pole position) (Races in italics indicate fastest lap)

Complete Formula Regional European Championship results 
(key) (Races in bold indicate pole position) (Races in italics indicate fastest lap)

References

External links 
 

2003 births
Living people
Italian F4 Championship drivers
ADAC Formula 4 drivers
Formula Regional European Championship drivers
Mücke Motorsport drivers
KIC Motorsport drivers
UAE F4 Championship drivers